The Vienna Girls' Choir is a choir of girls who are between ten and fifteen years of age.  Formed in 2004 in Vienna, Austria, the choir is a part of the Wirth Music Academy.  Gerald Wirth, the Artistic Director of the Vienna Boys' Choir, assists in the management of the girls' choir, which meets in the historic Josefsstöckl on the grounds of the Vienna Boys' Choir, which was established in 1498.

The choir performs traditional Austrian folk songs as well as traditional and contemporary pieces from many nations. The girls' choir doesn't tour regularly outside central Europe; a function normally reserved for the much more famous boy's choir.  However, in February 2007, the Vienna Girls' Choir traveled to India to perform with a children's choir from New Delhi.  This was the premiere of the World Peace Choir   Ravi Shankar hosted the meeting with rehearsals at the Ravi Shankar Institute for Music and Performing Arts (RIMPA).  In subsequent years the World Peace Choir has welcomed all top choirs and offer all the opportunity to tour internationally as a combined group.

References

External links 
 Vienna Girls' Choir

Choirs of children
Girls' and women's choirs
Musical groups established in 2004
Musical groups from Vienna
Austrian choirs
2004 establishments in Austria
Organisations based in Vienna